Luciana Salazar (born 7 November 1980) is an Argentine model, actress, dancer and businesswoman.

Biography

Modeling

Salazar started her career as a model at the age of four, when she shot her first television commercial. As a teenager, she began to work as a model in Buenos Aires in January 1996 and began to take dancing and singing classes.

Television
Her leap to fame was in the year 2000, when she posed for the magazines Noticias de la semana, of the Editorial Perfil, in which she was cover and Vogue en español, by Condé Nast Publications, where she came out on the pages.

Her breakthrough came with her performance on the television show Poné a Francella. In the United States, she was cover of the men's magazine Esquire, by Hearst Magazines, in October 2002. In 2003, she realized several journalistic notes for the Argentine television channel America TV and made a controversial appearance on the MTV Video Music Awards Latin America, promoting her image even more. In 2004, she participated in a hidden camera sketch, on the popular Argentinian television program VideoMatch (later ShowMatch), on the Telefé channel, hosted by Marcelo Tinelli.

She acted in the television series Costumbres argentinas, de las buenas y de las malas (2003), Los Roldán (2004), Amo de casa, Gladiadores de Pompeya. She appeared on the film Bañeros III, Todopoderosos and on Chilean television, invited by the channel Televisión Nacional de Chile on the show De Pé a Pá on 24 October 2004. She took part in the erotic television series Luli in Love on Playboy TV.

During the 2006 FIFA World Cup, Salazar was voted to be the national football team's representative, a role which many called "Godmother". On 2 December 2006, she was presented in the 2006 Telethon of Chile to host a segment called vedetón.

Modelling career
In February 2005 she was voted Queen of the Viña del Mar International Song Festival in Chile, and became a very popular personality in that country. She took part in various fashion shows, and in that same year she was the star of Abtao Fashion 2005, an event in Peru, along with 70 other Peruvian models who modeled the latest designs.

Other media
She has been reported to have been recording an album as a singer, and has participated in the movies Brigada Explosiva and Isidorito.

In 2008 she was a vedette in "Cristina en el país de las maravillas", along with Nito Artaza, Antonio Gasalla and Cacho Castaña.

In 2009, she signed a contract with the Warner Brothers label to launch 4 singles called Fascinate!, ¿Ahora que hago?, Sucios Pensamientos y Anímate a Vivir.

In 2011 she participated in fiction Un año para recordar in the role of Jasmín and as a singer in the band Main Out. In November of that year, he formed the Main Out musical project with the Cubans Seinel & Whaire, making her first presentation in the Susana Giménez program.

In 2012 she participated in the final chapters of the telenovela Graduados in the role of Mara.

In 2015 Salazar participated in the dance program Bailando por un sueño host by Marcelo Tinelli where she obtained the twelfth place after six months of competition.

In 2017 she announces to the media that she will be a mother for the first time thanks to a surrogate service.

In August 2018, she made a special participation in the fiction Cien días para enamorarse playing the lawyer Silvia Cafarole and is currently an entertainer of the entertainment program and entertainment Chismoses, of the Net TV channel.

In the 30-year Showmatch program, Luciana also participates in the Super Bailando 2019.

In 2020, Luciana becomes a stable panelist of the classic programme Polémica en el bar.

References

External links
 

1980 births
Living people
People from Buenos Aires
Argentine female models
Argentine vedettes
Argentine television personalities
Women television personalities
Argentine actresses
21st-century Argentine singers
21st-century Argentine women
Participants in Argentine reality television series
Bailando por un Sueño (Argentine TV series) participants